This is a list of places on the Victorian Heritage Register in the Rural City of Benalla in Victoria, Australia. The Victorian Heritage Register is maintained by the Heritage Council of Victoria.

The Victorian Heritage Register, as of 2021, lists the following seventeen state-registered places within the Rural City of Benalla:

References 

Benalla
+
+